Charles Graux may refer to:

Charles Graux (classicist) (1852–1882), French classicist
Charles Graux (politician) (1837–1910), Belgian politician